Little Mill railway station served the hamlet of Little Mill, Northumberland, England from 1847 to 1965 on the East Coast Main Line.

History 
The station opened on 1 July 1847 by the York, Newcastle and Berwick Railway as a private station for the Grey family. The station was planned to have passed through their private land at Howick Hall. Charles, Earl Grey protested to the engineer because he did not want the family's private land being violated so it was rerouted to the west and eventually opened. By then, Earl Grey had died so his son, Henry, was the one to enjoy the privileges of the private station. It opened to the public in January 1861. The station took its name from the neighbouring farmstead Littlemill. There were sidings that served a lime kiln and the whinstone quarry. Little Mill was one of the stations that closed due to the second world war on 5 May 1941. The station reopened on 7 October 1946. After the reopening, there were only weekday services at first but Sunday services were resumed in October 1947. The station closed to passengers on 15 September 1958 and closed for goods on 7 June 1965.

References

External links 

Disused railway stations in Northumberland
Former North Eastern Railway (UK) stations
Railway stations in Great Britain opened in 1847
Railway stations in Great Britain closed in 1941
Railway stations in Great Britain opened in 1946
Railway stations in Great Britain closed in 1958
1847 establishments in England
1965 disestablishments in England
Longhoughton